Ramaki-ye Ramezan (also Romanized as Ramakī-ye Ramez̤ān; also known as Ramakī-ye ‘Olyā) is a village in Posht Tang Rural District, in the Central District of Sarpol-e Zahab County, Kermanshah Province, Iran. At the 2006 census, its population was 722, in 127 families.

References 

Populated places in Sarpol-e Zahab County